Agapanthia kindermanni is a species of beetle in the family Cerambycidae. It was described by Pic in 1905. It is found in Turkey, including Hatay Province, İçel Province, Adana Province and Osmaniye Province.

References

kindermanni
Beetles described in 1905
Insects of Turkey